A bramble is any rough, tangled, prickly shrub.

Bramble or Brambles may also refer to:

Food and drink
 Blackberry, the fruit of the bramble plant
 Bramble (cocktail), a drink containing blackberry liqueur

Places
 Bramble, Indiana, United States, an unincorporated community
 Bramble, Minnesota, United States, an unincorporated community
 Bramble Bank, a sandbank in the Solent notable for an annual cricket match played during low tides
 Bramble Cay, Australia
 Bramble Peak, Victoria Land, Antarctica

Ships and boats
 , seven ships of the Royal Navy, and one ship which was never completed
 Bramble-class gunboat (1886), a Royal Navy class
 
 Bramble-class gunboat (1898), a Royal Navy class
 
 ST Brambles, a British tugboat
 , a United States Coast Guard buoy tender in commission from 1944 to 2003

People
 Bramble (surname)

Fictional characters
 Mathew and Tabitha Bramble, in the 1771 novel The Expedition of Humphry Clinker by Tobias Smollett
 Colonel Bramble, in Les Silences du Colonel Bramble (Colonel Bramble's Silences) by André Maurois
 Bramble, a main character of the Chinese animated cartoon brand Boonie Bears

Other uses
 Bramble (graph theory), a family of connected subgraphs for an undirected graph that all touch each other
 Brambles Limited, a listed Australian company
 Bramble (horse), sire of the thoroughbred racehorse Ben Brush, Prince of Melbourne etc.
 Bramble shark, a species of shark